The 2009–10 Ekstraklasa was the 76th season since its establishment as the highest football league of Poland. It began on 31 July 2009 and ended on 15 May 2010. The champions were Lech Poznań.

Teams
Due to several non-competitive events between last and this season, the team exchange among the two highest football divisions of Poland was only partially determined by the 2008–09 league tables.

ŁKS Łódź were denied a license by the Polish FA because of financial issues. ŁKS filed several appeals against this decision, but were eventually left without any success.

First League 2008–09 champions Widzew Łódź were not permitted to advance by the Polish FA after their involvement in the Polish corruption scandal. The club had its initial appeals rejected, however, an Arbitration Tribunal later returned a verdict in the club's favor which led the club to file a request for immediate reinstatement to the Ekstraklasa.

The decisions had a significant influence on the relegation and promotion of teams. As a consequence of their revoked license, ŁKS were put in last place of the 2008–09 Ekstraklasa standings and directly relegated to the First League. They were joined by Górnik Zabrze as 15th-placed team. Both teams were replaced with First League 2008–09 runners-up Zagłębie Lubin and third-placed Korona Kielce.

Because of the controversy surrounding both teams from Łódź, the Polish FA was forced to postpone the originally planned relegation/promotion play-off in June 2009 and eventually decided to cancel it completely.

Stadiums and locations

League table

Results

Player statistics

Top goalscorers

Season statistics
Including matches played on 9 April 2010; Source: 90minut.pl

Scoring
 First goal of the season: Arkadiusz Głowacki (Wisła Kraków)  Match: 2-0 Ruch Chorzów, 20th minute  (1 August 2009)
 Fastest goal in a match: Marcelo (Wisła Kraków) Match: 4-1 Zagłębie Lubin, 1st minute (7 August 2009)
 First hat-trick of the season: Adrian Paluchowski (Legia Warsaw) Match: 4-0 Zagłębie Lubin, 32', 48', 62'.(2 August 2009);
 Fastest hat-trick of the season: Adrian Paluchowski (Legia Warsaw) Match: 4-0 Zagłębie Lubin, 32', 48', 62', 30 minutes. (2 August 2009)
 Most goals scored by a player in one game: Adrian Paluchowski (Legia Warsaw) Match: 4-0 Zagłębie Lubin, 32', 48', 62', 3 goals.(2 August 2009);
 Widest winning margin: Lech Poznań Match: 5-0 Korona Kielce, 5 goals. (9 August 2009)
 Most goals in a match: Lechia Gdańsk Match: 6-2 Cracovia, 8 goals.(7 August 2009)

Awards

Player of the month

See also
 2009–10 Polish Cup

References

External links

 Official site

Ekstraklasa seasons
Poland
1